Allegheny Mountain (spelling as Alleghany Mountain in Virginia) is a major mountain ridge in the southern range of the Allegheny Mountains, part of the Appalachian Mountains.  It forms the Eastern Continental Divide along part of its course and also serves as part of the Virginia–West Virginia state line.

Major peaks
Listed from southwest to northeast:
 Hickory Knob – 
 Smith Knob
 Chestnut Knob
 High Top (Lookout Tower)
 Chestnut Levels
 Mad Tom
 Mad Sheep – 
 Paddy Knob – 
 Bald Knob
 Watering Pond Knob
 Bear Mountain
 Top of Allegheny (site of Camp Allegheny battlefield)
 Tamarack Ridge
 Grassy Knob

Principal gaps
 Rucker Gap
 Ryder Gap

See also
Monongahela National Forest
George Washington National Forest
Battle of Camp Allegheny

References

Allegheny Mountains
Ridges of West Virginia
Ridges of Virginia
Ridges of Pocahontas County, West Virginia
Landforms of Greenbrier County, West Virginia
Landforms of Alleghany County, Virginia
Landforms of Bath County, Virginia
Landforms of Highland County, Virginia
Monongahela National Forest
Borders of Virginia
Borders of West Virginia